Chepni of Rumkale is a distinct branch of the Chepni tribe inhabiting the northeastern portion of the province of Gaziantep in south-central Turkey, formerly the Ottoman kaza of Rumkale.

History
Chepni was already present in the region of Rumkale by early 16th century, but it is unknown when the tribe migrated to the region. In late 17th century, Chepni living around Rumkale were known to be settled and would ransack the localities of Pazarcık and Keferdiz, a practice inherited from their nomadic past. Some tribesmen later built the Chepni or Kazımiye Tekke in Aintab.

Chepni Tekke of Aintab
Although formed by Chepni, the Chepni Tekke in Gaziantep gradually became the center of all Alevi Turkomans and Kurds living near Aintab. In certain days of the year, people from the Barak villages, the vicinity of Besni, Marash, Sakçagözü, and Islahiye travel to the city for traditional celebrations. Visitors then kiss the hand of the Chepni Dede, who would arrive the same day, bring presents, and take part in recreational activities. The visitors then would take some of the water from the tekke's well home, since it is considered as holy as the Zamzam Well in Mecca.

Religion
All Chepni in the region traditionally follow the Alevi branch of Islam, and due to their belief, they were particularly distinguished from the nearby Sunni Kurdish population, who would traditionally see any kind of interaction with Alevis as a sin. Chepni of Rumkale namely belong to Dede Garkın and Musa Kâzım Ocaks.

References

Chepni people